Rhea Harder (born 27 February 1976 in East Berlin) is a German actress, best known for appearances in various German television series.

Early life
Harder was born in East Berlin and grew up in East Germany, completing her abitur. She then sat tests for the civil service in Berlin before being cast in Gute Zeiten, schlechte Zeiten and deciding on a career as actress.

Career
Harder played the role of Florentine 'Flo Spira' Spirandelli di Montalban in the television series Gute Zeiten, schlechte Zeiten from 1996 to 2002.

She played the role of Sarah Hermann in Berlin, Berlin from 2003 to 2005, and the role of Valerie Kopp in Alles außer Sex from 2005 to 2007.

She has been playing the role of police officer Franziska 'Franzi' Jung in the series Notruf Hafenkante since 2006.

Following the death in 2009 of Veronika Neugebauer, Harder took over the role of Gaby Glockner in the audio drama series TKKG.

Personal life
Harder's first son Moritz Paul Harder was born in 2004 and appeared as baby Ben in the series Berlin, Berlin in 2005. Her second son, Bruno Franz, was born in 2010. In June 2013 she married her longtime boyfriend Jörg Vennewald and in 2014 she gave birth to their daughter. They already have two sons, born in 2004 and 2010. The family lives in Hamburg.

Filmography
Films
 2000: 

TV series
 1994: Frauenarzt Dr. Markus Merthin
 1995: Die Straßen von Berlin
 1995–1996: Für alle Fälle Stefanie
 1995–2002: Gute Zeiten, schlechte Zeiten als Florentine 'Flo Spira' Spirandelli di Montalban 2000: Küstenwache – Jetski-Rowdies
 2001: Balko – Die Nervensäge
 2002: Leipzig Homicide – Verliebt in einen Lehrer
 2002: Küstenwache – Skrupellos
 2002/2003: Für alle Fälle Stefanie
 2003–2005: Berlin, Berlin as Sarah Hermann 2005: Küstenwache – Verloren in der Tiefe
 2005–2007: Alles außer Sex as Valerie Kopp 2006–2022: Notruf Hafenkante as Polizeiobermeisterin Franziska "Franzi" Jung''
 2008: SOKO Wismar – Tödliches Gebräu

Audio dramas
 Die drei ??? - Spuk Im Netz (Folge 132, Voice of Felica Sparing)
 TKKG - Das Mädchen mit der Kristallkugel (Folge 166, Voice of Maren)
 TKKG - Voice of Gaby Glockner (seit Folge 167)
 Fünf Freunde - Fünf Freunde und das Abenteuer im Hundeschlitten (Folge 83, Voice of Eva Moser)
 Die drei ??? - Der DreiTag

References

External links
 Website of Rhea Harder
 
 Rhea Harder at her agency Fitz+Skoglund Agents

German television actresses
People from East Berlin
1976 births
Living people
Actresses from Berlin
20th-century German actresses
21st-century German actresses